Bjørnevatn Station is a former railway station, located at Bjørnevatn in Sør-Varanger, Norway, that was the terminus of the Kirkenes–Bjørnevatn Line.

References

Railway stations in Sør-Varanger
Railway stations opened in 1910
Disused railway stations in Norway
1910 establishments in Norway
Year of disestablishment missing